United Bank for Africa Kenya Limited, commonly referred to as UBA Kenya, is a commercial bank in Kenya. It is licensed and supervised by the Central Bank of Kenya, the central bank and national banking regulator.

The bank is a small-sized commercial bank in Kenya, the largest economy in the East African Community. UBA Kenya Limited is a subsidiary of the Nigerian financial conglomerate United Bank for Africa, with subsidiaries in 20 African countries, the United States, the United Kingdom and France.

History
Established in 2009, with capital investment of KES:2.5 billion (approx. US $ 25 million), the bank has accumulated losses of KES:1.4 billion (approx. US $ 14 million) in the seven years that followed. UBA Kenya made a profit for the first time during the first half of 2016.

Ownership
United Bank for Africa (Kenya) is a wholly owned subsidiary of United Bank for Africa, headquartered in Lagos, Nigeria.

Branches
The bank maintains networked branches at the following locations:

 Westlands Branch - Apollo Centre, Westlands, Nairobi (Main Branch)
 Upper Hill Branch - NHIF Building, Upper Hill, Nairobi
 Industrial Area Branch - Industrial Area, Enterprise Road, Nairobi

See also

 List of banks in Kenya
 Central Bank of Kenya
 Economy of Kenya

References

External links
 Website of Central Bank of Kenya

Banks of Kenya
Banks established in 2009
Companies based in Nairobi
United Bank for Africa
Kenyan companies established in 2009